Jens Jakobs (born March 5, 1985) is a Swedish ice hockey player.

Jakobs made his Elitserien debut playing with Mora IK during the 2005–06 season.

References

External links

1985 births
AIK IF players
Almtuna IS players
Djurgårdens IF Hockey players
Leksands IF players
Linköping HC players
Living people
Luleå HF players
Malmö Redhawks players
Mora IK players
Nottingham Panthers players
Nyköpings Hockey players
People from Säter Municipality
Storhamar Dragons players
Swedish ice hockey right wingers
Sportspeople from Dalarna County